These are the most popular given names in the United States of America for all years of the 1890s.

1890 

Males
John
William
James
George
Charles
Joseph
Frank
Harry
Henry
Edward
Females
Mary
Anna
Elizabeth
Emma
Margaret
Rose
Ethel
Florence
Ida
Bertha; Helen (tie)

1891 

Males
John
William
James
George
Joseph
Charles
Frank
Henry
Harry
Robert
Females
Mary
Anna
Margaret
Florence
Elizabeth
Clara
Rose
Helen
Emma; Ethel (tie)
-----

1892 

Males
John
William
James
George; Joseph (tie)
Charles
Frank
Harry
Thomas
-----
-----
Females
Mary
Anna
Margaret
Florence
Elizabeth
Rose
Ruth
Ethel
Helen; Minnie (tie)
-----

1893 

Males
John
William
George
Joseph
Charles
James
Frank
Edward
Thomas
Walter
Females
Mary
Anna
Margaret
Elizabeth
Helen
Ruth
Florence
Bertha
Ethel
Rose

1894 

Males
John
William
George
James
Joseph
Charles
Frank
Harry
Thomas
Robert
Females
Mary
Anna
Margaret
Helen
Elizabeth
Ruth
Florence
Ethel
Marie
Rose

1895 

Males
John
William
James; Joseph (tie)
George
Charles
Frank
Henry; Walter (tie)
Harry
-----
-----
Females
Mary
Anna
Elizabeth
Helen
Ruth
Margaret
Florence
Marie; Rose (tie)
Ethel
-----

1896 

Males
John
William
James
George
Joseph
Frank
Charles
Harry
Robert
Edward
Females
Mary
Anna
Helen
Margaret
Ruth
Marie
Elizabeth
Rose
Ethel
Florence

1897 

Males
John
William
James
George
Joseph
Charles
Frank
Robert
Harry
Edward
Females
Mary
Anna
Helen
Ruth
Margaret
Florence
Rose
Marie
Elizabeth
Lillian

1898 

Males
John
William
George
James
Joseph
Charles
Frank
Edward
Robert
Henry
Females
Mary
Anna
Helen
Margaret
Ruth
Elizabeth
Florence
Rose
Lillian
Ethel; Marie (tie)

1899 

Males
John
William
George
James
Joseph
Charles
Frank
Robert
Henry
Edward
Females
Mary
Anna
Margaret
Helen
Marie
Elizabeth
Florence
Ruth
Ethel
Alice

References
http://www.ssa.gov/OACT/babynames/index.html
http://www.ssa.gov/OACT/babynames/decades/names1890s.html

1890s
1890s in the United States